Ouvrage Col de la Valette is a lesser work (petit ouvrage) of the Maginot Line's Alpine extension, the Alpine Line. Apart from a portion of Block 3 and the bare gallery system, little was completed. The post overlooks the valley of the Tinée at Isola on one side, and Beuil on the other.

Description

Block 1 (not built): west entry.
Block 2 (not built): east entry.
Block 3 (incomplete): observation block with a VDP cloche (not installed).
Block 4 (not built): infantry casemate with two twin machine gun embrasures.

AP Isola
The advanced post at Isola, in the valley below Col de la Valette, was built by MOM (Main d’Œuvre Militaire), which built many of the lesser posts.  Built in 1931, Isola consisted of four blocks: a north entrance with one machine gun, an emergency exit, a machine gun casemate and an observation block with an AP cloche. The post was manned by 5 non-commissioned officers and 27 men.  A small gallery system connected the blocks and provided shelter. The post is located in the bank of the Tinée just south of Isola at an altitude of

See also
 List of Alpine Line ouvrages

References

Bibliography

External links 
 Col de la Valette (petit ouvrage du) at fortiff.be 
 Isola(avant poste d') at fortiff.be 
 

COLV
Maginot Line
Alpine Line